Roger Fletcher Gibson Jr. (February 21, 1944 – September 30, 2015) was an American philosopher specializing in epistemology and the philosophy of language. He was best known as a leading exponent of the philosophy of W. V. Quine.

Biography 

Gibson was born in St. Louis, Missouri, to Roger Fletcher Gibson Sr. and Virginia Irene Melton. He spent his formative years moving throughout the country, eventually coming to live with his maternal grandparents about whom he would later remark were the most influential people in his life. Gibson joined the United States Marine Corps out of high school and volunteered for duty in Vietnam. He served in Saigon from October 1965 to October 1966. He considered his military service one of his greatest achievements.

Gibson embarked upon the pursuit of philosophy as an academic career in 1967 upon the completion of his military service. He was ready to resume his education that year, having served in the United States Marine Corps immediately after high school, between 1962 and 1966, attached for part of that time as aide to General Westmoreland during the height of the Vietnam War. He enrolled in Northeast Missouri State College, currently Truman State University, where he graduated in 1971 with a B.A. in philosophy.

Encouraged by his undergraduate philosophy professors, Henry Smits and Kay Blair, both holding doctorates from the University of Missouri, he applied to their graduate program in philosophy and was admitted in the fall of 1971. He developed a budding affinity for analytic philosophy while at the University of Missouri, receiving an M.A. in 1973 and a Ph.D. in 1977. His experience there was shaped by Arthur Berndtson, Donald Oliver, and John Kultgen, among others, the latter also directing his dissertation.

Gibson served the discipline both as a leader and as a scholar. His first notable leadership role was as President of the Central States Philosophical Association in 1983–1984. His scholarly initiatives attracted attention from the outset, earning him grants from the National Endowment for the Humanities in 1984–1985  and 1988. His academic career flourished at Washington University in St. Louis, where he began teaching in 1985. He served as the Chair of the Department of Philosophy there for a decade between 1989 and 1999. His many contributions to the department included spearheading the creation of the school's Philosophy-Neuroscience-Psychology (PNP) Program in 1993, playing a prominent role in securing grants for that purpose from the James S. McDonnell Foundation.

Gibson's formal areas of expertise were epistemology and the philosophy of language, with further competence in the philosophy of science. While publishing extensively in these areas, his overall engagement with philosophy was broad and deep enough for publication in other specialties as well, including those as diverse as logic and ethics. Most of his works, even on the rare occasion he turned to ethics, tend to revolve around the philosophy of W. V. Quine. Those that do are all well-received (as are the few that do not), earning him a reputation as one of the world's leading exponents of Quine.

That reputation is the culmination of an early and steadfast interest in Quine. His master's thesis (1973) and doctoral dissertation (1977) are both on Quine. His persistent appeals to the Harvard philosopher for permission to sit in on his classes at Harvard University, while himself still enrolled as a graduate student at the University of Missouri, are something of an academic legend, related by Quine himself both in his autobiography, The Time of My Life: An Autobiography (1985), and in his foreword to Gibson's first book, The Philosophy of W. V. Quine: An Expository Essay (1982). The permission granted paved the way for some of the most influential secondary literature on Quine, including two monographs, three edited volumes, and numerous articles. Gibson's two monographs — The Philosophy of W. V. Quine: An Expository Essay (1982) and Enlightened Empiricism: An Examination of W. V. Quine's Theory of Knowledge (1988) — are held in especially high regard.

His personal output on Quine was complemented by his ability to bring out the same in others. Attesting to his dedication to the enrichment of Quine studies, he organized, together with Robert B. Barrett Jr., a conference (April 9–13, 1988) bringing together at Washington University in St. Louis the world's foremost authorities on the subject, including Quine himself, as well as Donald Davidson, Dagfinn Føllesdal, Susan Haack, Gilbert Harman, Jaakko Hintikka, Jerrold Katz, Barry Stroud, and Joseph S. Ullian. The proceedings were published in 1990 as Perspectives on Quine.

A festschrift organized in his honor in 2008 brought together eminent analytic philosophers from around the world: Robert B. Barrett Jr.; Lars Bergström; Richard Creath; David Henderson; Terence Horgan; Ernest Lepore; Pete Mandik; Alex Orenstein; Kenneth Shockley; J. Robert Thompson; Josefa Toribio; Joseph S. Ullian; Josh Weisberg; Chase B. Wrenn.

Gibson died at the age of 71 in Reston, Virginia, after a long battle with Parkinson's and Parkinson's dementia.

Selected publications

Books

Articles

Reviews

References

External links 

 Gibson's autobiographical post on the alumni page of the University of Missouri Philosophy Department
 Announcement of Gibson's death by the Department of Philosophy at Washington University in St. Louis
 Memorial Minutes contributed by Mark Rollins to the American Philosophical Association (behind a paywall)

1944 births
2015 deaths
20th-century American philosophers
Epistemologists
Philosophers of science
Analytic philosophers
American philosophy academics
Philosophers of language
Truman State University alumni
University of Missouri alumni
United States Marines
United States Marine Corps personnel of the Vietnam War
People from Unionville, Missouri
Washington University in St. Louis faculty